Alaemon is a genus of birds in the family Alaudidae, commonly called hoopoe larks.

Taxonomy and systematics
The name Alaemon comes from the Greek alēmōn, meaning "wanderer" (from alaomai, meaning "to wander"). The genus was established by Alexander Keyserling and Johann Heinrich Blasius in 1840.

Extant species
The genus contains two species:

Former species
Other species, or subspecies, formerly considered as species in the genus Alaemon include:
 Damara longbill (as Alaemon damarensis)
 Gordonia longbill (as Alaemon bradshawi)
 Benguela long-billed lark (as Alaemon benguelensis)
 South-eastern Dupont's lark (as Alaemon Margaritae)

References

 
Bird genera
Taxa named by Alexander von Keyserling
Taxa named by Johann Heinrich Blasius